In geometry, the conchoid of Dürer, also called Dürer's shell curve, is a plane, algebraic curve, named after Albrecht Dürer and introduced in 1525.  It is not a true conchoid.

Construction

Suppose two perpendicular lines are given, with intersection point O. For concreteness we may assume that these are the coordinate axes and that O is the origin, that is (0, 0). Let points  and  move on the axes in such a way that , a constant.

Equation
The equation of the conchoid in Cartesian form is

In parametric form the equation is given by

where the parameter  is measured in radians.

Properties
The curve has two components, asymptotic to the lines .  Each component is a rational curve.  If a > b there is a loop, if a = b there is a cusp at (0,a).

Special cases include:
 a = 0: the line y = 0;
 b = 0: the line pair  together with the circle ;

The envelope of straight lines used in the construction form a parabola (as seen in Durer's original diagram above) and therefore the curve is a point-glissette formed by a line and one of its points sliding respectively against a parabola and one of its tangents.

History
It was first described by the German painter and mathematician Albrecht Dürer (1471–1528) in his book Underweysung der Messung (Instruction in Measurement with Compass and Straightedge p. 38), calling it Ein muschellini (Conchoid or Shell). Dürer only drew one branch of the curve.

See also
Conchoid of de Sluze
 List of curves

References

External links

Algebraic curves
Albrecht Dürer
16th-century introductions
1525 in science